L66  may refer to:

 GM L66 engine, an OEM V6 engine
 HMS Quorn (L66), a Hunt-class destroyer
 L66 (airport), an American public airport
 L66A1, British Army designation of the Walther PP